The Pseudocossinae are a subfamily of the family Cossidae (carpenter or goat moths).

Genera
 Pseudocossus  Kenrick, [1914]

References

External links
Natural History Museum Lepidoptera generic names catalog

 
Cossidae
Moth subfamilies